Tinissa wayfoongi is a moth of the family Tineidae. It was described by Robinson and Tuck in 1998. It is found in Brunei.

References

Moths described in 1998
Scardiinae